Novaya Otradovka is a rural locality (a selo) and the administrative centre of Otradovsky Selsoviet, Sterlitamaksky District, Bashkortostan, Russia. The population was 1,242 as of 2010. There are 25 streets.

Geography 
Novaya Otradovka is located 7 km southwest of Sterlitamak (the district's administrative centre) by road. Zagorodny is the nearest rural locality.

References 

Rural localities in Sterlitamaksky District